Prince Maurice may refer to:

Prince Moritz of Anhalt-Dessau (1712–1760)
Prince Maurice of Battenberg (1891–1914)
Moritz, Landgrave of Hesse (1926–2013)
Prince Maurizio, Duke of Montferrat (1762–1799)
Prince Maurice of the Netherlands (1843–1850)
Maurice, Prince of Orange (1567–1625)
Maurice of the Palatinate (1620–1652)
Prince Maurice of Savoy (1593–1657)
Prince Maurice of Teck (March–September 1910), son of Alexander Cambridge, 1st Earl of Athlone

See also
Charles Maurice de Talleyrand-Périgord (1754–1838)
John Maurice, Prince of Nassau-Siegen (1604–1679)
Maurice Henry, Prince of Nassau-Hadamar (1626–1679)
William Maurice, Prince of Nassau-Siegen (1649–1691)
Prince Maurits (disambiguation)
Prince Moritz (disambiguation)